Rodencia y el diente de la princesa (English: A Mouse Tale) is a 2012 Peruvian-Argentine animated adventure comedy film, directed by David Bisbano and produced by Red Post Studio.

Plot
An old legend says that in a vast and wild forest, there is a fantastic kingdom Rodencia, a place inhabited by marvelous creatures and powerful wizards. Rodencia y el diente de la princesa follows the adventures of the little Edam, an awkward wizard's apprentice, along with the beautiful and safe little mouse Brie, accompanied by the greatest warriors of the kingdom, they begin an incredible journey, where they will face the most surprising dangers for a magical and legendary power and thus defeat the dark forces led by the evil wizard Rotex-Texor of the rats, which threatens to invade Rodencia.

Voice cast

Spanish cast
 Hernán Bravo as Edam
 Natalia Rosminati as Brie
 Ricardo Alanis as Roquefort
 Enrique Porcellana as Gruyère
 Sergio Bermejo as Rotex-Texor
 Oswaldo Salas as Blue, General Rat and Edam grandfather

Portuguese cast
 Philippe Maia as Edam
 Erika Menezes as Brie
 Luiz Carlos Persy as Rotex-Texor

English cast 

 Tom Arnold as Dalliwog the Wizard
 Drake Bell as Sebastian
 Miranda Cosgrove as Princess Samantha "Sam"
 Jon Heder as Sir Jonas
 Cary Elwes as Sir Thaddeus
 Jon Lovitz as The King of Mice
 Aracely Arambula as Kimmy
 Gregg Sulkin as The Dark Rodent
 Dallas Lovato as The Queen of Mice
 Savannah Hudson as Mozzarella
 Brandon Hudson as Provolone

References

External links

2012 films
2012 animated films
2012 comedy films
Peruvian animated films
Peruvian adventure comedy films
Argentine adventure comedy films
Argentine animated films
2012 computer-animated films
2010s Spanish-language films

2010s Peruvian films
2010s Argentine films